is a professional Japanese baseball player. He plays pitcher for the Chunichi Dragons.

In the  NPB season, Tajima tied a Japanese baseball record for most games pitched without conceding a run starting from opening day recording 31 consecutive scoreless games. He tied the Dragons record for consecutive scoreless games held by former teammate Akifumi Takahashi.

References

External links

 NPB.com

1989 births
Living people
Baseball people from Nagoya
Japanese baseball players
Nippon Professional Baseball pitchers
Chunichi Dragons players